Alexela Group is an Estonian holding company.  Its three areas of activity are energy, the metal industry, and property development. The majority of the group's shares are owned by Estonian businessman Heiti Hääl.

History
The first company of the group, trailer manufacturer AS Bestnet, was established in 1990. The fuel retail company fuel retailer AS Alexela Oil was established in 1993. In 2002, a petroleum product terminal was opened in Paldiski, Estonia, and in 2007, in Sillamäe, Estonia.  In March 2006, Alexela Oil purchased from YX Energi the Uno-X chain in Estonia, Latvia, and Lithuania.  In 2009–2010, it sold its service stations in Lithuania to Neste Oil and in Latvia to LR īpašumu aģentūra.

In 2006, a hot dip galvanising services provider AS Paldiski Tsingipada (Zincpot) was established. In May 2007, Alexela Logistics bought Norwegian oil terminal Vest Tank (now Alexela Slovaag) in Sløvåg Gulen, Sogn og Fjordane, Norway.  On May 24, 2007, one day after the acquisition entered into force, an explosion occurred in a tank having severe environmental and health consequences for people living nearby.  According to the court ruling, the former owner of Vest Tank had to pay 160 million Norwegian krone to Alexela Solvaag to cover the costs of emptying the containers, renovating the terminal and liquidating the pollution caused by the explosion.

The LNG terminal developer AS Balti Gaas was established in 2009. In 2011, Alexela bought a majority stake in the liquid gas retailer Reola Gaas from Neste.  In December 2011, Alexela bought a 50% stake in Kiviõli Keemiatööstus, a shale-oil producer. In 2014, remaining stakes in Reola Gaas and Kiviõli Keemiatööstus, as also Gasum's Estonian business were acquired by Alexela. In 2012, it created an electricity retailer Elektrimüügi AS.

The group was reorganized as a holding company in summer 2012. That time the group was controlled by Heiti Hääl and Kazakhstan's businessman Igor Bidilo who together owned 73.8% of shares. In 2014, Bidilo was bought out from the company and main owners became brothers Heiti and Marti Hääl.

In 2015, Reola Gaas was merged into Alexela Energia.  In 2018, Alexela purchased the electricity retailer 220 Energia.

Operations

Energy
Alexela Group's energy-companies are Alexela Oil, Alexela Energia, Kiviõli Keemiatööstus,  Alexela Logistics, and Balti Gaas.  Alexela Oil is an operator of service stations chain in Estonia. Alexela Energia is a seller of electricity and gas.  Kiviõli Keemiatööstus is a producer of shale oil. Balti Gaas is planning an LNG terminal in Paldiski. Together with Haminan Energia and Wärtsilä Alexela develops a LNG terminal in Hamina, Finland.

Alexela Logistics is an oil transportation and logistics company, which through its daughter companies owns and operates oil terminals in Paldiski, Sillamäe (both in Estonia) and Sløvåg (Norway).  The company had a stake also in the terminal in Murmansk (Russia); however, this stake was sold in October 2007.  In addition to Heiti Hääl and management of the company, the major shareholder is Puma Energy, a subsidiary of Trafigura.

Metal industry
AS Bestnet is a trailer manufacturer and S Paldiski Tsingipada (Zincpot) is a hot dip galvanising services provider.

Property development
AS OmaKoduMaja is a developer of industrial parks. Baltic Exchange is an owner of the historical building of the Baltic Exchange. The building was disassembled and transported to Estonia, where it planned to be assembled in Tallinn.

See also

 Energy in Estonia

References

Oil companies of Estonia
Natural gas companies of Estonia
Electric power companies of Estonia
Metal companies of Estonia